Jason Matthews may refer to:

Jason Matthews (footballer) (born 1975), English footballer
Jason Matthews (boxer) (born 1970), British boxer
Jason Matthews (novelist) (1951–2021), American spy novelist and former CIA officer

See also
Jason Mathews (born 1971), American football player